Country Thunder is a music festival company that hosts several concerts in North America each year. They have operated festivals in Arizona since 1993, in Wisconsin since 1996, in Saskatchewan since 2005, in Alberta since 2016, and in Florida since 2019. Each festival offers entertainment on multiple stages. The main stage hosts national acts, with talent playing throughout the day. The side stage gives local artists opportunities to perform.

Florence, Arizona

Country Thunder Arizona is held on the Canyon Moon Ranch in Florence, Arizona. The festival runs Thursday through Sunday, typically during the first week of April. Fans can purchase a single day pass or a weekend pass that allows them access to the festival for the entire weekend. The festival also offers reserved seating.

Headliners in previous years have included Morgan Wallen, Eric Church, Chris Young, Dierks Bentley, Blake Shelton, Thomas Rhett, Jason Aldean, Luke Bryan, Toby Keith, and Cole Swindell.

Twin Lakes, Wisconsin

Country Thunder Wisconsin is held in Twin Lakes, Wisconsin. The event was awarded the "Festival of the Year" Academy of Country Music Award in 2015.

The festival is typically run from Thursday through Sunday during the third weekend of July. In the past, performers like Luke Bryan, Sam Hunt, Toby Keith, and Dierks Bentley have appeared.

Craven, Saskatchewan

In 2005, Troy Vollhoffer, owner of parent company Premier Global Productions, took over Craven, Saskatchewan's Rock 'N The Valley festival and relaunched it as the Craven Country Jamboree — returning the event to its previous roots as a country music festival. On October 27, 2016, it was announced that the event had been integrated into the Country Thunder brand as Country Thunder Saskatchewan.

Calgary, Alberta 

In August 2016, Country Thunder launched Country Thunder Alberta in Calgary, Alberta, located in Prairie Winds Park. Previous headliners have included Big & Rich, Tim McGraw, Brad Paisley, Blake Shelton and Toby Keith.

Kissimmee, Florida 
In March 2019, Country Thunder launched the festival in Kissimmee, Florida, located in Osceola Heritage Park. Previous headliners have included Luke Bryan, Toby Keith, and Luke Combs.

Festival of the Year 

Country Thunder Wisconsin 2015 and Country Thunder Arizona 2018 were named Festival of the Year by the Academy of Country Music.

References

External links

Country music festivals in the United States
Annual events in the United States
Music festivals in Arizona
Music festivals in Wisconsin
Tourist attractions in Pinal County, Arizona
Tourist attractions in Kenosha County, Wisconsin
Music festivals established in 1993
1993 establishments in the United States
Music festivals staged internationally
Country music festivals in Canada
Annual events in Canada
Music festivals in Alberta
Music festivals in Saskatchewan
2006 establishments in Canada